Kalateh-ye Nasir (also Romanized as Kalāteh-ye Naşīr; also known as Nasīrābād and Naşīr) is a village in Qaen Rural District, in the Central District of Qaen County, South Khorasan Province, Iran. At the 2006 census, its population was 252, in 61 families.

References 

Populated places in Qaen County